Of gods and girls is the solo album by rapper producer Mr. J. Medeiros. It was released in 2007.

Track listing
"Amelie" (featuring 20Syl)	
"Silent Earth"
"Strangers"
"Constance"
"Change" (featuring Strange Fruit Project and Rez)
"King of Rock Bottom"
"Half A Dream" (featuring Marty James)
"Keep Pace"
"Money" (featuring Pigeon John)
"Her Wings"
"Apathy"
"Call You"
"Honest Mans Hustle"
"Constance (Joe Beats Remix)"
"Silent Earth (Ohmega Watts Remix"
"Keep Pace (Stro Remix)"

References

2007 albums
Mr. J. Medeiros albums